The digital root (also repeated digital sum) of a natural number in a given radix is the (single digit) value obtained by an iterative process of summing digits, on each iteration using the result from the previous iteration to compute a digit sum. The process continues until a single-digit number is reached. For example, in base 10, the digital root of the number 12345 is 6 because the sum of the digits in the number is 1 + 2 + 3 + 4 + 5 = 15, then the addition process is repeated again for the resulting number 15, so that the sum of 1 + 5 equals 6, which is the digital root of that number. In base 10, this is equivalent to taking the remainder upon division by 9 (except when the digital root is 9, where the remainder upon division by 9 will be 0), which allows it to be used as a divisibility rule.

Formal definition 
Let  be a natural number. For base , we define the digit sum  to be the following:

where  is the number of digits in the number in base , and
 
is the value of each digit of the number.

This is because if , then

and therefore

because .
If , then trivially 

Example
In base 12, 8 is the additive digital root of the base 10 number 3110, as for 
 
 
 
 
 
This process shows that 3110 is 1972 in base 12. Now for 
 
 
 
shows that 19 is 17 in base 12. And as 8 is a 1-digit number in base 12,

Direct formulas
We can define the digit root directly for base   in the following ways:

Congruence formula
The formula in base  is:

or,

The digital root is the value modulo  because  and thus  so regardless of position, the value  is the same –  – which is why digits can be meaningfully added. Concretely, for a three-digit number 
.

To obtain the modular value with respect to other numbers , one can take weighted sums, where the weight on the -th digit corresponds to the value of  modulo . In base 10, this is simplest for 2, 5, and 10, where higher digits vanish (since 2 and 5 divide 10), which corresponds to the familiar fact that the divisibility of a decimal number with respect to 2, 5, and 10 can be checked by the last digit (even numbers end in 0, 2, 4, 6, or 8). 

Also of note is the modulus : since  and thus  taking the alternating sum of digits yields the value modulo .

Using the floor function
It helps to see the digital root of a positive integer as the position it holds with respect to the largest multiple of  less than the number itself. For example, in base 6 the digital root of 11 is 2, which means that 11 is the second number after . Likewise, in base 10 the digital root of 2035 is 1, which means that .

With this in mind the digital root of a positive integer  may be defined by using floor function , as

Properties
This property can be used as a sort of checksum, to check that a sum has been performed correctly. 

 The digital root of the product of nonzero single digit numbers  in base  is given by the Vedic Square in base . 

Additive persistence
The additive persistence counts how many times we must sum its digits to arrive at its digital root. 

For example, the additive persistence of 2718 in base 10 is 2: first we find that 2 + 7 + 1 + 8 = 18, then that 1 + 8 = 9. 

There is no limit to the additive persistence of a number in a number base . The smallest numbers of additive persistence 0, 1, ... in base 10 are:
0, 10, 19, 199, 19 999 999 999 999 999 999 999, ... 
The next number in the sequence (the smallest number of additive persistence 5) is 2 × 102×(1022 − 1)/9 − 1 (that is, 1 followed by 2 222 222 222 222 222 222 222 nines). For any fixed base, the sum of the digits of a number is proportional to its logarithm; therefore, the additive persistence is proportional to the iterated logarithm.

Programming example
The example below implements the digit sum described in the definition above to search for digital roots and additive persistences in Python.
def digit_sum(x: int, b: int) -> int:
    total = 0
    while x > 0:
        total = total + (x % b)
        x = x // b
    return total

def digital_root(x: int, b: int) -> int:
    seen = set()
    while x not in seen:
        seen.add(x)
        x = digit_sum(x, b)
    return x

def additive_persistence(x: int, b: int) -> int:
    seen = set()
    while x not in seen:
        seen.add(x)
        x = digit_sum(x, b)
    return len(seen) - 1

In popular culture 
Digital roots are used in Western numerology, but certain numbers deemed to have occult significance (such as 11 and 22) are not always completely reduced to a single digit.

Digital roots form an important mechanic in the visual novel adventure game Nine Hours, Nine Persons, Nine Doors.

See also 

 Arithmetic dynamics
 Base 9
 Casting out nines
 Digit sum
 Divisibility rule
 Hamming weight
 Multiplicative digital root

References







External links 
 Patterns of digital roots using MS Excel

Algebra
Arithmetic dynamics
Base-dependent integer sequences
Number theory

de:Quersumme#Einstellige (oder iterierte) Quersumme